The 1984 Winfield New Zealand Masters was a professional invitational snooker tournament, which took place in July 1984 at the Kingsgate Convention Centre in Auckland, New Zealand. It was the first professional snooker tournament to be held in the country.

Jimmy White won the tournament beating Kirk Stevens 5–3 in the final.

Main draw

References

New Zealand Masters (snooker)
1984 in snooker
1984 in New Zealand sport
July 1984 sports events in New Zealand